Zapotiltic is a town and municipality in the south region of the state of Jalisco, Mexico. It is approximately 115 km south of Guadalajara. According to the "Conteo de Poblacion y Vivienda of 2015" the town has a population of 29,190.

Toponymy 
Zapotiltic comes from the Náhuatl words Tzápotl (zapote) and tlíitic (black), meaning "place of the black zapotes". This name was adopted due to the abundance of this fruit in the area in the past.

Government 
The form of government is democratic and depends on the Jalisco state government and the federal government. Elections are held every three years, when the municipal president and her/his council are elected. The incumbent municipal president is a member of the National Action Party (PAN); he and his municipal council rule backed by such political party. They were elected in the elections of 1 July 2018

In 1936, the Municipal Palace was taken amidst shootings, blood, and fire, by command of the State Government; since the outgoing municipal president, Cayetano Vega, refused to hand over power. In addition to members of the Army, the following people participated: Julio Lares Rodríguez, president-elect; Serafín González, Maximiano Llamas, Fortunato Lares,  and Aurelio Reyes, among others.

The municipality has 38 towns, the most important are: Zapotiltic (municipal seat), Arco de Cobianes (El Coahuayote), El Rincón, Tasinaxtla (La Cañada), Aserradero, Huescalapa, Villa Lázaro Cárdenas (Aserradero).

Municipal presidents

Sister cities
 Tlaquepaque, Jalisco, México

References

External links 
Pagina web de Zapotiltic
Gobierno de Zapotiltic
Noticias de Zapotiltic y la región sur de Jalisco
Sistema de información del Estado de Jalisco

Municipalities of Jalisco